David Mascato García (born 13 October 1975) is a Spanish sprint canoeist and marathon canoeist who competed in the early to mid-2000s. He won a silver medal in the C-2 1000 m event at the 2001 ICF Canoe Sprint World Championships in Poznań.

Mascato also competed in two Summer Olympics, earning his best finish of fourth in the C-2 500 m event at Sydney in 2000.

References

1975 births
Canoeists at the 2000 Summer Olympics
Canoeists at the 2004 Summer Olympics
Living people
Olympic canoeists of Spain
Spanish male canoeists
ICF Canoe Sprint World Championships medalists in Canadian